Miss U.S. International is the official United States preliminary to the Miss International Beauty Pageant (officially titled The International Beauty Pageant). The United States has sent a representative to the Miss International pageant since its inception in 1960. The only year a representative was not sent was in 2006.

The current titleholder is Kenyatta Beazer of Maryland, who was crowned on July 22, 2022 will representing USA at Miss International 2023 beauty pageant.

History
During the early 1960s the United States was represented by Miss National Press Photographer. From 1963-1967 the organizers ran the Miss American Beauty section candidates a few days before the Miss International finals, and after that the U.S. representative's sash was changed to American Beauty instead United States.

Since the Miss International Beauty Pageant moved to Japan in 1968. From 1968–1970, They invited Miss Welcome to Long Beach, which sponsored by the Junior Chamber of Commerce selected the winner to compete at Miss International in Japan.

Alfred Patricelli of Bridgeport, Connecticut, who was the executive director of the Miss World USA were asked to selected contestants. From 1971–1976, he handpicked the representatives from their lists of Miss World USA contestants. However, he organized the Miss International USA pageant only 2 times, which was held in 1973 and 1975.

From 1977–1983, California Beauty Pageant Inc. lead by Leonard Stallcup were the license holders for Miss International. He organized Miss California International, and the winner every years will represent as American Beauty at Miss International.

From 1984–1989, the Miss Universe organization were the license holders, and sent delegates from runner-up of Miss USA to Miss International. In 1987, the U.S. representative's sash was changed back to United States and USA respectively and continued to the present. It is unknown who was in charge of selecting the contestants from 1990–2006, but mostly they sent Californian girls to Japan.

Currently, Harrison Productions, LLC is the license holders for Miss International in the United States since 2007 and the winner of the Miss U.S. International pageant will competes at the Miss International Beauty Pageant every years.

Results summary

Placements in Miss International
USA holds a record of 32 placements at Miss International.

Miss International: Brucene Smith (Miss International 1974), Katherine Ruth (Miss International 1978), Christie Claridge (Miss International 1982)
1st Runners-up: Linda Taylor (1964), Gail Krielow (1965), Anna Rapagna (1979), Charissa Ewing (1980), Sarie Joubert (1985), Dana Richmond (1988), Amy Holbrook (2004)
2nd Runners-up: Pamela Elfast (1967), Karen MacQuarrie (1968)
3rd Runners-up: Joyce Bryan (1963), Jacqueline Jochims (1971), Patricia Bailey (1975), Susan Carlson (1976)
4th Runners-up: Charlene Lundberg (1960), Carolyn Joyner (1962), Lindsay Bloom (1972), Laura Bobbitt (1977), Lindsay Becker (2015), Kaitryana Leinbach (2016)
Top 15: Gayle Kovaly (1969), Randi Blesener (1970), Lisa Schuman (1981), Kimberly Bleier (1983), Cindy Williams (1986), Paula Morrison (1987), Deborah Husti (1989), Shawna Bouwman (1990), Amanda Delgado (2012), Andrea Neu (2013)

Awards
Miss Photogenic: Christie Claridge (1982)
Miss Mobile Beauty: Aileen Yap (2009)

Titleholders 
This is a list of women who have represented the United States at the Miss International pageant.

Color key

Notes:
  † Now deceased

By number of states

Winners' gallery

See also
 Miss USA
 United States representatives at Miss World
 Miss Earth United States
 Miss Supranational USA
 Miss Grand USA

References

External links
 www.missusinternational.com
 www.miss-international.org

United States
Beauty pageants in the United States
1960 establishments in California
American awards